The Bing Xin Children's Literary Award (Bing Xin ertong wenxue xinzuo jiang 冰心儿童文学新作奖) is named after the Chinese writer Bing Xin, whose work has made her a key figure in 20th-century Chinese literature. It is an annual award intended to "honor the creativity of Chinese Children's literature and in addition to discovering and fostering new authors, supporting and encouraging outstanding children's literature and publishing..."wards were announced in 2005.

Bing Xin's daughter Wu Qing continues to be involved with the Bing Xin Children's Literature Award.

References

Chinese children's writers
Awards established in 2005
2005 establishments in China
Chinese children's literary awards
Chinese literary awards
Children's literary awards